Fort Lemhi was a mission approximately two miles (3 km) north of present-day Tendoy, Idaho, occupied by Mormon missionaries from 1855 to 1858.

Approximately twenty-seven Mormon men left the Salt Lake Valley on May 18, 1855, as instructed by Brigham Young with Thomas S. Smith serving as the leader of this group and George Washington Hill as their main Shoshonean language interpreter. The party reached the Salmon River valley (then in Oregon Territory) on May 27 and selected a permanent site for its mission on June 15, 1855. The mission was named Fort Limhi for King Limhi who was one of the kings cited in the Book of Mormon. In Mormon scripture, King Limhi organized an expedition that lasted 22 days, the same duration it required the Mormon missionaries to reach the Salmon River Country. Consequently, they named their mission after King Limhi, and Limhi eventually became "Lemhi" .

The community grew to over 200 people. The settlers brought stock raising and irrigated farming to the region, and dug ditches which are still in use. At least three of the Mormon missionaries at Fort Lemhi married Shoshone women.

Due to high prices for cattle to supply the US Army sent to participate in the Utah War and anger at the Mormons aiding their traditional enemies the Nez Perce, the Bannocks under the leadership of Shoo-woo-koo and some Shoshone acting in alliance with them stole the Mormon missionaries' cattle herd and many of their horses. A few of the Mormons were killed in this process, and the fort was abandoned in about February 1858.

Fort Lemhi was reoccupied in 1862 by miners, who grew vegetables there for sale.

The name Lemhi became applied to the Lemhi River and valley surrounding the mission site, as well as to the Lemhi Shoshone whom the mission served, the Lemhi Pass and eventually Lemhi County.

The site is on the National Register of Historic Places.

See also
 Lemhi, Idaho

References

External links
  History of Fort Lemhi

Lemhi
History of the Church of Jesus Christ of Latter-day Saints
1855 establishments in Oregon Territory
History of Idaho
Buildings and structures in Lemhi County, Idaho
Properties of religious function on the National Register of Historic Places in Idaho
Lemhi
National Register of Historic Places in Lemhi County, Idaho